John Stephen Snashall (born 12 October 1982) is a former English cricketer.  Snashall is a right-handed batsman who bowls right-arm medium pace.  He was born at Eastbourne, Sussex.

Snashall represented the Sussex Cricket Board in 2 List A matches against the Essex Cricket Board and Wales Minor Counties in the 1st and 2nd rounds of the 2002 Cheltenham & Gloucester Trophy; both matches were played in 2001.  In his 2 List A matches, he scored 59 runs at a batting average of 29.50, with a single half century high score of 56.

References

External links
John Snashall at Cricinfo
John Snashall at CricketArchive

1982 births
Living people
Sportspeople from Eastbourne
English cricketers
Sussex Cricket Board cricketers